https://www.cmstory.org/exhibits/robinson-spangler-north-carolina-room-image-collection-charlotte-postcard-collection/horner

Horner Military School was a military academy of North Carolina, United States.

The school was founded by James H. Horner in 1851 in Oxford, North Carolina. It was run by Horner and his sons.

The school was moved to Charlotte, North Carolina in 1914 after a fire destroyed the barracks. It was at that time housed in a "fireproof" concrete and brick building located at the tallest point of the Myers Park area of Charlotte. Today Myers Park Country Club is located next to this site. The Myers Park Country Club bought much of the grounds associated with the school and training grounds and now houses multiple buildings, pool and tennis facilities and an elite golf course.

The school itself was closed in 1920. The original building remains and is now a privately-owned condominium building housing 21 units known as the Country Club Rockledge.

See also

List of defunct military academies in the United States

References

Educational institutions established in 1851
Defunct United States military academies
Defunct schools in North Carolina